CARFAX, Inc. is an American company that provides vehicle data to individuals and businesses. Its best-known product is the CARFAX Vehicle History Report. Other products include vehicle listings, car valuation, and buying and maintenance advice.

History
CARFAX was founded in Columbia, Missouri in 1984 by Ewin Barnett III and Robert Daniel Clark. In 1986, by working closely with the Missouri Automobile Dealers Association, the company offered an early version of the CARFAX vehicle history report to the dealer market. These reports were developed with a database of 10,000 records and distributed via fax. In December 1996, the company launched its website as part of an effort to sell its reports directly to consumers.

CARFAX has undergone several ownership changes since its founding. In the fall of 1999, Carfax became a wholly owned subsidiary of R.L. Polk & Company. In 2013, IHS acquired Polk and CARFAX. In March 2016, IHS had a merger of equals with Markit, becoming IHS Markit. On February 28, 2022, S&P Global purchased IHS Markit, and CARFAX became a brand in the company's newly formed S&P Global Mobility business unit.

Products and services

Vehicle history reports
The CARFAX Vehicle History Report is the company's best-known product. A CARFAX Report can provide information about the number of owners a used car has had, accidents it has been in, title issues, whether it was a fleet vehicle, and its maintenance record, among other aspects of its history.

Information sourcing
CARFAX claims to have access to 20 billion records  from more than 100,000 sources, including motor vehicle departments for the 50 U.S. states and the 10 Canadian provinces. The company's information sources include U.S. state title and registration records, auto and salvage auctions, Canadian motor vehicle records, rental and fleet vehicle companies, consumer protection agencies, state inspection stations, extended warranty companies, insurance companies, fire and police departments, manufacturers, inspection companies, service and repair facilities, dealers and import/export companies.

CARFAX lists only information that is reported to them. Hence, consumers should not take these reports to be an exhaustive accident history. Not all accidents are disclosed and CARFAX uses the language "no accidents have been reported to CARFAX," the emphasis being on "reported". Consumers should not rely on CARFAX alone when checking out a used vehicle.

Although CARFAX continuously expands its database and resources, some information is not allowed to be provided. Under the 1994 U.S. Drivers Privacy Protection Act, personal information such as names, telephone numbers and addresses of current or previous owners are neither collected nor reported. CARFAX does not have access to every facility and mistakes are sometimes made by those who input data. In the event information is disputed but cannot be verified, CARFAX allows consumers and dealerships to add information to its reports.

Legal disputes

West v. CARFAX 
In 2006 class action lawsuit, the plaintiff claimed that CARFAX violated consumer protection laws by not disclosing the limitations of their service, specifically their inability to check accident records in 23 states in the U.S. while stating that their database contains information from all 50 states. The lawsuit was settled in May 2007 in the Trumbull County Common Pleas Court in Warren, Ohio. The company asserts that it has major accident information from all 50 states and it backs up its claim with a buyback guarantee. The settlement in the West v. CARFAX, Inc lawsuit was overturned, not on the merits of the issue, but on the terms of the settlement which did not offer enough to the affected consumers and because "not enough consumers were notified and the judge should not have agreed to the settlement without knowing more about what it would cost CARFAX."

See also
 Lemon (automobile)
 Vehicle Identification Number
 Vehicle title branding

References

External links
 CARFAX.com website

Online automotive companies of the United States
American companies established in 1984
Internet properties established in 1984
Used car market
Companies based in Fairfax County, Virginia
1984 establishments in Missouri